The Mpraeso constituency is in the Eastern region of Ghana. The current member of Parliament for the constituency is Davis Ansah Opoku. He was elected on the ticket of the New Patriotic Party (NPP) and won a majority of 73.56%, 25,064 votes more than the candidate closest in the race, to win the constituency election to become the MP. He succeeded Seth Kwame Acheampong who had represented the constituency from 2009 to 2021 in the 4th Republican parliament on the ticket of the New Patriotic Party (NPP).

See also
List of Ghana Parliament constituencies

References

Parliamentary constituencies in the Eastern Region (Ghana)